Plastocyanin is a copper-containing protein that mediates electron-transfer. It is found in a variety of plants, where it participates in photosynthesis.  The protein is a prototype of the blue copper proteins, a family of intensely blue-colored metalloproteins. Specifically, it falls into the group of small type I blue copper proteins called "cupredoxins".

Function 
In photosynthesis, plastocyanin functions as an electron transfer agent between cytochrome f of the cytochrome b6f complex from photosystem II and P700+ from photosystem I.  Cytochrome b6f complex and P700+ are both membrane-bound proteins with exposed residues on the lumen-side of the thylakoid membrane of chloroplasts.  Cytochrome f acts as an electron donor while P700+ accepts electrons from reduced plastocyanin.

Structure 

Plastocyanin was the first of the blue copper proteins to be characterised by X-ray crystallography. It features an eight-stranded antiparallel β-barrel containing one copper center.

Structures of the protein from poplar, algae, parsley, spinach, and French bean plants have been characterized crystallographically.  In all cases the binding site is generally conserved. Bound to the copper center are four ligands: the imidazole groups of  two histidine residues (His37 and His87), the thiolate of Cys84 and the thioether of Met92. The geometry of the copper binding site is described as a ‘distorted trigonal pyramidal’.  The Cu-S (cys) contact is much shorter (207 picometers) than Cu-S (met) (282 pm) bond.  The elongated Cu-thioether bond appears to destabilise the CuII state thereby enhancing its oxidizing power. The blue colour (597 nm peak absorption) is assigned to a charge transfer transition from Spπ to Cudx2-y2.

In the reduced form of plastocyanin, His-87 becomes protonated.

While the molecular surface of the protein near the copper binding site varies slightly, all plastocyanins have a hydrophobic surface surrounding the exposed histidine of the copper binding site.  In plant plastocyanins, acidic residues are located on either side of the highly conserved tyrosine-83.  Algal plastocyanins, and those from vascular plants in the family Apiaceae, contain similar acidic residues but are shaped differently from those of plant plastocyanins—they lack residues 57 and 58.  In cyanobacteria, the distribution of charged residues on the surface is different from eukaryotic plastocyanins and variations among different bacterial species is large. Many cyanobacterial plastocyanins have 107 amino acids. Although the acidic patches are not conserved in bacteria, the hydrophobic patch is always present.  These hydrophobic and acidic patches are believed to be the recognition/binding sites for the other proteins involved in electron transfer.

Reactions
Plastocyanin (Cu2+Pc) is reduced (an electron is added) by cytochrome f according to the following reaction:

Cu2+Pc + e− → Cu+Pc

After dissociation, Cu+Pc diffuses through the lumen space until recognition/binding occurs with P700+, at which point P700+ oxidizes Cu+Pc according to the following reaction:

Cu+Pc → Cu2+Pc + e−

The redox potential is about 370 mV and the isoelectric pH is about 4.

Entatic state 
A catalyst's function is to increase the speed of the electron transfer (redox) reaction. Plastocyanin is believed to work less like an enzyme where enzymes decrease the transition energy needed to transfer the electron. Plastocyanin works more on the principles of entatic states where it increases the energy of the reactants, decreasing the amount of energy needed for the redox reaction to occur.

To study the properties of the redox reaction of plastocyanin, methods such as quantum mechanics / molecular mechanics (QM/MM) molecular dynamics simulations.

Four-coordinate copper complexes often exhibit square planar geometry, however plastocyanin has a trigonally distorted tetrahedral geometry. This distorted geometry is less stable than ideal tetrahedral geometry due to its lower ligand field stabilization as a result of the trigonal distortion. This unusual geometry is induced by the rigid “pre-organized” conformation of the ligand donors by the protein, which is an entatic state. Plastocyanin performs electron transfer with the redox between Cu(I) and Cu(II), and it was first theorized that its entatic state was a result of the protein imposing an undistorted tetrahedral geometry preferred by ordinary Cu(I) complexes onto the oxidized Cu(II) site. However, a highly distorted tetrahedral geometry is induced upon the oxidized Cu(II) site instead of a perfectly symmetric tetrahedral geometry. A feature of the entatic state is a protein environment that is capable of preventing ligand dissociation even at a high enough temperature to break the metal-ligand bond. In the case of plastocyanin, it has been experimentally determined through absorption spectroscopy that there is a long and weak Cu(I)-SMet bond that should dissociate at physiological temperature due to increased entropy. However, this bond does not dissociate due to the constraints of the protein environment dominating over the entropic forces.

In ordinary copper complexes involved in Cu(I)/Cu(II) redox coupling without a constraining protein environment, their ligand geometry changes significantly, and typically corresponds to the presence of a Jahn-Teller distorting force. However, the Jahn-Teller distorting force is not present in plastocyanin due to a large splitting of the dx2-y2 and dxy orbitals (See Blue Copper Protein Entatic State). Additionally, the structure of plastocyanin exhibits a long Cu(I)-SMet bond (2.9Å) with decreased electron donation strength. This bond also shortens the Cu(I)-SCys bond (2.1Å), increasing its electron donating strength. Overall, plastocyanin exhibits a lower reorganization energy due to the entatic state of the protein ligand enforcing the same distorted tetrahedral geometry in both the Cu(II) and Cu(I) oxidation states, enabling it to perform electron transfer at a faster rate. The reorganization energy of blue copper proteins such as plastocyanin from 0.7 to 1.2 eV (68-116 kJ/mol) compared to 2.4 eV (232 kJ/mol) in an ordinary copper complex such as [Cu(phen)2]2+/+.

In the ocean 
Usually, plastocyanin can be found in organisms that contain chlorophyll b and cyanobacteria, as well as algae that contain chlorophyll c. Plastocyanin has also been found in the diatom, Thalassiosira oceanica, which can be found in oceanic environments. It was surprising to find these organisms containing the protein plastocyanin because the concentration of copper dissolved in the ocean is usually low (between 0.4 – 50 nM). However, the concentration of copper in the oceans is comparatively higher compared to the concentrations of other metals such as zinc and iron. Other organisms that live in the ocean, such as phytoplankton, have adapted to where they do not need these low concentration metals (Fe and Zn) to facilitate photosynthesis and grow.

References

Further reading 

 
 

Photosynthesis
Coordination complexes
Copper proteins